Sŏp'yŏngyang station (West P'yŏngyang station) is a railway station in Sŏsŏng-guyŏk, P'yŏngyang, North Korea. It is on located on the P'yŏngra and P'yŏngŭi lines of the Korean State Railway. 

Local transit connections can be made to Line 3 of the P'yŏngyang tram system.

History
The station was originally opened by the Chosen Government Railway on 16 November 1929.

References

Railway stations in North Korea
Buildings and structures in Pyongyang
Transport in Pyongyang
Railway stations opened in 1929
1929 establishments in Korea